The JCB HMEE (High Mobility Engineer Excavator) is a military engineering vehicle made by JCB.

Design
The HMEE is an armoured backhoe loader designed for high speeds in order to self-deploy with military convoys. Most backhoes are limited to much lower speeds. It is also capable of towing heavy loads and has good off-road mobility. It is based on technology from the JCB Fastrac tractors.

The HMEE is built at JCB's plant in Pooler, Georgia, integrating armour made by American Defense Systems (ASDI).

Specifications
Engine: Cummins QSB 6.7
Weight:  armoured,  unarmoured
Speed: Up to

Users
 Australian Army: 8 vehicles
 British Army: 17 vehicles
 Danish Army: 6 vehicles
 Irish Defence Forces : 1 vehicle
 Israel Defense Forces
 New Zealand Army: 6 vehicles
 Spanish Army: 4 vehicles
 Swedish Army: 22 vehicles
 US Army: 800 vehicles

References

External links

Military engineering vehicles